"Silence Is Golden" is a song initially recorded by the American rock band the Four Seasons. Written by Bob Crewe and Bob Gaudio, Philips Records released it in 1964 as the B-side of the U.S. number 1 single "Rag Doll", which was also written by Crewe/Gaudio. The Tremeloes' 1967 cover version reached number 1 on the UK Singles Chart and number 11 on the US charts.

The Tremeloes version

In 1967 British band The Tremeloes recorded their sound-alike take using the same arrangement as the original; this rendition reached the top position on the UK chart on 18 May 1967, where it stayed for three weeks. Band member Len 'Chip' Hawkes remembered getting up in the middle of the night, going to London with the rest of the band and walking down The Strand in the night the song reached number one. Guitarist Rick Westwood sang lead vocal on "Silence Is Golden".  In the U.S., Epic Records released the single, which reached number 11 on the Billboard Hot 100 chart and was one of the top 100 songs of 1967. The song sold one million copies globally, earning gold disc status. The Tremeloes also recorded an Italian version, "E in silenzio". The song was also covered in 1967 by The Plus Four, and by Swedish singer Jim Jidhed (in English) in 1989.

Chart history

Weekly charts

Year-end charts

References

External links
The Tremeloes information (unofficial)

1964 singles
1967 singles
Songs written by Bob Gaudio
Songs written by Bob Crewe
The Four Seasons (band) songs
Irish Singles Chart number-one singles
Number-one singles in New Zealand
Number-one singles in Norway
Number-one singles in South Africa
UK Singles Chart number-one singles
Philips Records singles
Epic Records singles
1964 songs
The Tremeloes songs
Song recordings produced by Mike Smith (British record producer)